Strongylognathus afer is a species of ant in the genus Strongylognathus. It is endemic to Algeria.

References

Strongylognathus
Endemic fauna of Algeria
Insects of North Africa
Hymenoptera of Africa
Insects described in 1884
Vulnerable animals
Vulnerable biota of Africa
Taxonomy articles created by Polbot